The 1951 Appalachian State Mountaineers football team was an American football team that represented Appalachian State Teachers College (now known as Appalachian State University) as a member of the North State Conference during the 1951 college football season. In their only year under head coach Pres Mull, the Mountaineers compiled an overall record of 6–3, with a mark of 3–3 in conference play, and finished fourth in the NSC.

Schedule

References

Appalachian State
Appalachian State Mountaineers football seasons
Appalachian State Mountaineers football